Chamburu is a village on the northwest coast of Guadalcanal, Solomon Islands.

References

Populated places in Guadalcanal Province